Captain News is a 24-hour Tamil News  television channel started on 29 August 2012 from Captain Media Network by Desiya Murpokku Dravida Kazhagam, a political party in the Indian state of Tamil Nadu. The managing director of Captain Media is LK Sudhish brother-in-law of Vijayakanth who is the party's president and a Tamil actor.

References

Tamil-language television channels
Television stations in Chennai
24-hour television news channels in India
Television channels and stations established in 2012
Mass media companies of India